Francis Dominic Casey,  (3 August 1890 – 11 August 1917) was an Irish flying ace of the Royal Naval Air Service during the First World War, credited with nine aerial victories. He received the Distinguished Service Cross before his death during a test flight in 1917.

Early life
Francis Dominic Casey was born in Clonmel, County Tipperary, the youngest son of Maurice J. Casey and Agnes M. Casey, and was educated at St. George's College, Weybridge.

First World War
In August 1914, when the First World War broke out, Casey was working for the Peninsular and Oriental Steam Navigation Company. On 27 May 1916 Casey's Royal Naval Reserve commission was cancelled, and the following day he was re-commissioned as a probationary flight sub-lieutenant in the Royal Naval Air Service. On 3 August 1916 he was confirmed in his rank of flight sub-lieutenant, with seniority from 28 May.

Casey served in No. 2 Wing, and was eventually posted to No. 3 (Naval) Squadron to fly the Sopwith Pup single-seat fighter. He gained his first aerial victory on 17 March 1917, driving down out of control a Halberstadt D.II fighter over Bapaume. On 1 April Casey was promoted to flight lieutenant, and gained his second victory a week later, driving down an Albatros D.III fighter on 8 April. He then gained seven more victories, six of them D.III fighters, in only twelve days, from 21 April to 2 May. On 12 May he received a mention in despatches, and on 22 June was awarded the Distinguished Service Cross. His citation read:

Appointed to the acting rank of flight commander, Casey died in a flying accident during a test flight on 11 August 1917. He is buried in Adinkerke Military Cemetery in De Panne, West Flanders, Belgium.

List of aerial victories

Endnotes

References
 

1890 births
1917 deaths
People from Clonmel
People educated at St George's College, Weybridge
Irish aviators
Royal Naval Air Service personnel of World War I
Irish World War I flying aces
Recipients of the Distinguished Service Cross (United Kingdom)
Aviators killed in aviation accidents or incidents
Victims of aviation accidents or incidents in 1917
Burials at Adinkerke Military Cemetery
British military personnel killed in World War I
Royal Naval Reserve personnel